Our Lady of Czestochowa Parish –  designated for Polish immigrants in Worcester, Massachusetts, United States. Founded in 1903. It is one of the Polish-American Roman Catholic parishes in New England in the Diocese of Worcester.

Name of the parish is linked with the cult of Black Madonna of Częstochowa.

History
Assumption of parish is counted from the assignment of the first pastor, Fr. John Z. Moneta in 1903, however plans and the land purchase ware made many years earlier.

The Polish immigrants of Worcester for the most part, came from the northeastern Poland, Podlaskie Voivodeship counties, such as Lomza.

Pastors
 Rev. John Z. Moneta (1903–1907)
 Rev. Peter C. Reding (1907–1911)
 Rev. Joseph Tomikowski (1911–1913)
 Rev. Msgr. Bolesław A. Bojanowski (1913–1956)
 Rev. Msgr. Charles J. Chwałek (1956–1976)
 Rev. Msgr. Chester J. Janczukowicz (1976–1993)
 Rev. Thaddeus X. Stachura (1993–2014)
 Rev. Richard Polek (2014–   )

Schools

Grade School 

 St Mary's Grade School

High school
 St Mary's Jr & Sr High School – is a college preparatory school sponsored by Our Lady of Czestochowa Parish in the Diocese of Worcester, MA.

Polish language school
 Polish language school (Szkoła j. polskiego im. Jana Pawła II pol.)

References

Bibliography
 

 

 
 The Official Catholic Directory in USA

External links

 Our Lady of Czestochowa Parish – ParishesOnline.com
 Our Lady of Czestochowa Parish – TheCatholicDirectory.com 
  Diocese of Worcester

Roman Catholic parishes of Diocese of Worcester
Polish-American Roman Catholic parishes in Massachusetts